Multiple theories regarding the origin of the name California, as well as the root language of the term, have been proposed, but most historians believe the name likely originated from a 16th-century novel, Las Sergas de Esplandián. The novel, popular at the time of the Spanish exploration of Mexico and the Baja California Peninsula, describes a fictional island named California, ruled by Queen Calafia, east of the Indies. The author of the novel, Garci Rodríguez de Montalvo, also known as Ordóñez de Montalvo, is thought to have derived the term California from the Arabic Khalif and/or Khalifa, but he might also have been influenced by the term "Califerne" in the 11th-century epic French poem The Song of Roland.

When Spanish explorers in the 16th century first encountered the Baja California Peninsula, west of the Sea of Cortez, they believed the peninsula to be an island similar to the island described in de Montalvo's novel. They named the land California. Initially, California applied only to Baja California Peninsula, but as Spanish explorers and settlers moved north and inland, the region known as California, or Las Californias, grew. Eventually it included not only the peninsula, but also the lands north of the peninsula, along the coast of today's U.S. state of California. Unlike the peninsula, this region was only practical to reach by sea voyages, and acquired a separate identity: Alta (Upper) California, making the lower territory Baja (Lower) California.

Today, the name California is shared by many places throughout the world, but is most commonly associated with areas of the southwest United States, and northwest Mexico. When used alone, California generally refers to the U.S. state of California, but when paired with the term "baja", or "lower", it can refer to the Baja California Peninsula, or one of the Mexican states on the peninsula, Baja California, or Baja California Sur. Collectively, the U.S. and Mexican states constitute a region referred to as The Californias.

Las Sergas de Esplandián origin theory

In the early 16th-century romance novel Las sergas de Esplandián (The Adventures of Esplandián), California was the name of a mythical island populated only by black warrior women. The popular Spanish novel was printed in several editions, with the earliest surviving edition published about 1510. The author was Garci Rodríguez de Montalvo, also known as Ordóñez de Montalvo. The novel described the Island of California as being east of the Indies, close to the Terrestrial Paradise, and ruled by Queen Calafia.

For many years the de Montalvo novel languished in obscurity, with no connection between it and the naming of California. That changed in 1862 when Edward Everett Hale made such a connection. He presented his findings to the Antiquarian Society that year, and then laid out his findings, along with a portion of the original novel, in the March 1864 issue of the Atlantic Monthly. Hale concluded that when Spanish explorers came upon the Baja California Peninsula, they named it California, after the fictional island in de Montalvo's book, because the explorers thought the peninsula was an island, east of the Indies, similar to the island described in de Montalvo's novel.

An excerpt from the novel, where California is first mentioned, using a contemporary Spanish translation:

The English translation, as it appeared in the Atlantic Monthly in March 1864:
Know, then, that, on the right hand of the Indies, there is an island called California, very close to the side of the Terrestrial Paradise, and it was peopled by black women, without any man among them, for they lived in the fashion of Amazons. They were of strong and hardy bodies, of ardent courage and great force. Their island was the strongest in all the world, with its steep cliffs and rocky shores. Their arms were all of gold, and so was the harness of the wild beasts which they tamed and rode. For, in the whole island, there was no metal but gold.

–Las Sergas de Esplandián, (novela de caballería)
by Garci Rodríguez de Montalvo.
Published in Seville in 1510.

Hale supposed that in inventing the names, de Montalvo held in his mind the Spanish word , the term for a leader of an Islamic community. George Davidson wrote in 1910 that Hale's theory was the best yet presented, but offered his own addition. In 1917, Ruth Putnam printed an exhaustive account of the work performed up to that time. She wrote that both  and  most likely came from the Arabic word  which means steward, successor or leader.

Putnam discussed Davidson's 1910 theory based on the Greek word  (meaning beautiful) but discounted it as exceedingly unlikely, a conclusion that Dora Beale Polk agreed with in 1995, calling the theory "far-fetched". Putnam also wrote that The Song of Roland held a passing mention of a place called , perhaps named thus because it was the caliph's domain, a place of infidel rebellion. 

Chapman elaborated on this connection in 1921: "There can be no question but that a learned man like Ordóñez de Montalvo was familiar with the  ...This derivation of the word 'California' can perhaps never be proved, but it is also plausible—and it may be added too interesting—to be overlooked." Polk characterized this theory as "imaginative speculation", adding that another scholar offered the "interestingly plausible" suggestion that Roland's Califerne is a corruption of the Persian , a mythological "mountain of Paradise" where griffins lived.

Song of Roland origin theory

The Song of Roland is an 11th-century Old French epic poem that describes the August 15, 778, defeat, and retreat, of Charlemagne's army by the Basque army at the Battle of Roncevaux Pass in the Pyrenees. On line 2924 of the poem, which is in verse number CCIX (209), the word Califerne is one of the lands mentioned, with no indication of its geographic location. It is, however, mentioned after a reference to Affrike, or Africa.

The original French verse CCIX (lines 2920–2924):

An English translation of verse CCIX (lines 2920–2924):
Dead is my nephew, who conquered so much for me!
Against me will rebel the Saxons,
Hungarians, Bulgars, and many hostile men,
Romans, Apulians, and all those of Palermo,
And those of Africa, and those of Califerne;

–Song of Roland, Verse CCIX (lines 2920–2924), 11th century

The word , from the Song of Roland, may have served as an inspiration to Montalvo for the name "California", since both works contain a similar plot point; a battle between Christian and non-Christian armies. The author of the Song of Roland, who is believed to be the Norman poet Turoldus, is thought to have derived  from caliph.

Other origin theories
Several alternate theories have been proposed as possible origins of the word California, but they all have been dismissed, or at least determined by historians to be less compelling than the novel, Las Sergas de Esplandián. Some of the most studied alternate theories include the following.

Calida Fornax
This term could derive from the Old Spanish *, an alteration of the Latin , meaning hot furnace.

This theory may explain why the circa 1650 map of the Island of California has the name as two words, "Cali Fornia."

Kali forno
Another suggested source is kali forno, an indigenous phrase meaning "high mountains". However, the name "California" was printed in Montalvo's book before Spanish explorers spoke with Native Americans.

Calahorra
Another possible source for California's name may be Calahorra in Spain.

Application of the name

Hernán Cortés is often credited with being the first to apply the name California to the Baja Peninsula, but researchers believe it was more likely one of the men he assigned to do some advance exploration of the South Sea. Diego de Becerra and Fortún Ximénez, under the direction of Cortés, landed near the southern tip of the Baja California peninsula in 1533. They were the earliest explorers who would likely have applied the name California to the peninsula, thinking it was an island. Cortés did not reach the Baja peninsula until 1535, when he tried unsuccessfully to establish a colony that he named La Paz, under a royal charter granting him that land.

It has also been suggested that Hernando de Alarcón, sent by the viceroy Mendoza—an enemy of Cortés—on a 1540 expedition to verify Cortés's discoveries, referred to the inhospitable lands as California, and it was he who named the peninsula after the fabled island in Las Sergas. There is no question about Hernando de Alarcón's use of the term, nor about his allusion to Las Sergas, but there is question as to whether this is the first use of the name to refer to those lands and whether he intended the name as mockery. Alarcón provides a clear link from the literary, imaginary California to the real place, but his usage cannot be proven to be the actual origin, in that the name might predate him.

Today the name California is applied to the Baja California Peninsula, the Gulf of California (also known as the Sea of Cortés), the U.S. State of California, and the Mexican states of Baja California and Baja California Sur.

See also
California (disambiguation)
Etymology
Toponymy
United States
History of California
History of California before 1900
List of state and territory name etymologies of the United States
Mexico
History of Mexico
List of Mexican state name etymologies

References

Notes

Citations

Bibliography

Further reading
  An anthology of writings that describe Baja California, and the Gulf of California, from sources dated from the mid-sixteenth century to present.

External links
Short radio episode Terrestrial Paradise, from Las Sergas de Esplandián. California Legacy Project.